Telamoptilia tiliae is a moth of the family Gracillariidae. It is known from Japan (Hokkaidō) and the Russian Far East.

The wingspan is 6.8–8 mm.

The larvae feed on Tilia maximowicziana. They probably mine the leaves of their host plant.

References

 

Acrocercopinae
Moths of Japan
Moths described in 1988